Saakini Daakini is a 2022 Indian Telugu-language action comedy film directed by Sudheer Varma and produced by Suresh Productions, Guru Films, and Kross Pictures. An official remake of the 2017 South Korean film Midnight Runners, it stars Regina Cassandra and Nivetha Thomas. The film has music composed by Mikey McCleary.

Principal photography took place from March 2021 to August 2021, entirely in Hyderabad. Saakini Daakini was released theatrically on 16 September 2022.

Plot 
Shalini and Damini, two police trainees from differing backgrounds, become fierce rivals after their induction into the academy and their placement in the same room. Their conflict eventually escalates into a full-blown brawl that nearly leads to their suspension. However, after Shalini helps an injured Damini during a forest run challenge when no one else does, their conduct is commended and they become best friends.

One day, they witness a kidnapping of a girl on their way back from the club at midnight. The local police station's missing persons department, however, is busy with the kidnapping of a son of a businessman at the time and is unable to investigate the case. Knowing that they are in the critical hours after a kidnapping, they embark on their amateur investigation.

When Shalini and Damini catch up with the kidnappers, it appears that the gang is running an unfertilized egg harvesting ring and there are many more girls locked up at their hideout. Shalini and Damini tries to save them but are instead beaten and locked up. After escaping their captors, they return the next day to an empty hideout and a cold trail. As they are not acting police officers, their professor tells them not to pursue the case any further. Unable to wait for the bureaucracy to resolve the case, they once again embark on their own investigation.

They undergo heavy physical training and manage to track the kidnappers down, with the help of CCTV footage, to a fertility clinic. Armored up with weapons, the duo venture in to liberate the girls by themselves, this time much more prepared. They successfully take down all the kidnappers and their boss and save all girls. However, due to some among the disciplinary committee believing that they had done the right thing morally, they are instead held back a year in their studies and start training from beginning.

Cast 

 Regina Cassandra as Damini, Police Trainee 
 Nivetha Thomas as Shalini,  Police Trainee 
 Bhanu Chander as Pratap IPS, Police Academy head
 Prudhvi Raj as Raghu, Police Academy Instructor
 Raghu Babu as Brahma Rao, Control room incharge 
 Kabir Duhan Singh
 Amit Tiwari
 Chammak Chandra as Police Academy trainer
 Ravi Varma as Fertility Doctor
 Bhadram as Govindam
 Auto Ramprasad as Chutney Chandu
 Lahari Shari as Weapons Incharge

Production 
In January 2020, producer Suresh Babu acquired the remake rights of the South Korean film Midnight Runners in a collaboration with the Seoul-based Kross Pictures. Director Sudheer Varma was signed to helm the remake in the same month. Actress Regina Cassandra and Nivetha Thomas were signed to play lead roles in August 2020. The film has music  composed by Mikey McCleary.

The film commenced its principal photography in March 2021 but was halted due to the COVID-19 pandemic. Final schedule resumed in July that year with shoot wrapping up in August 2021. The film's title was confirmed as Saakini Daakini in November 2021.

The film is Varma's first remake as a director. While the original film featured two male protagonists, Varma swapped their genders to females and tweak the script accordingly. The film was shot entirely in Hyderabad.

Release

Theatrical 
Saakini Daakini was released theatrically on 16 September 2022.

Home media 
Earlier in December 2021, the makers contemplated a direct-to-streaming release on Netflix due to the pandemic.

Reception 
Balakrishna Ganeshan of The News Minute rated the film 2.5 out of 5 stars and wrote, "It feels like there is no progress in the story and that the plot is moving in the same circle. The comedy in scenes involving Prithviraj and others in the first half, which keeps the film light-hearted, completely misses its mark in the second half". The Times of India rated the film 2.5 out of 5 stars, stating, "Despite its entertaining first half, the film ends up over ambitious in the second half crumbling under its own weight. But this show of girl power by Regina and Nivetha is a welcome change". Sakshi Post rated the film 2 out of 5 stars and commented, "Watch Saakini Daakini at your own risk. If you love Korean movies, check out the original version instead!". Sangeetha Devi Dundoo of The Hindu stated, "Nivetha Thomas and Regina Cassandra make this action entertainer about two girls who punch above their weight, a fun watch."

References

External links
 

2022 films
Suresh Productions films
Films shot in Hyderabad, India
Indian remakes of South Korean films
2022 action comedy films
Indian action comedy films
Films set in universities and colleges
Films about kidnapping in India
Police detective films
Indian buddy comedy films
Films set in police academies
Girls with guns films
2020s female buddy films
Films directed by Sudheer Varma
Films scored by Mikey McCleary